The A62 road in Northern England runs between the cities of Leeds in West Yorkshire and Manchester in Greater Manchester covering a distance of . It passes through Heckmondwike, Huddersfield, Failsworth and Oldham.

Route
The A62 begins at a junction with the A58 road as Gelderd Road in Leeds. It runs through West Yorkshire, passing through Birstall, Heckmondwike, Liversedge, Huddersfield, Linthwaite, Slaithwaite, and Marsden. It crosses the Pennines at Standedge, and continues through Saddleworth and into Oldham. From there, the A62 runs into Manchester as Oldham Street and Oldham Road through Failsworth, ending at the Manchester Inner Ring Road.

History
It is paralleled at some distance by part of the M62 Trans-Pennine motorway. Before the M62 was built, the A62 was the main trans-Pennine road between Oldham and Huddersfield. The M62 is numbered after the A62 and now takes most of the long-distance traffic between Manchester and Leeds.

References

External links

 SABRE page on the A62
 2012 photo essay on effects of recession

Transport in Manchester
Roads in England
Roads in Yorkshire
Transport in West Yorkshire